John Francis may refer to:

 John Francis (priest) (died 1724), Irish Anglican priest
 John Francis (sculptor) (1780–1861), English sculptor
 John Brown Francis (1791–1864), United States Senator from Rhode Island
 John F. Francis (1808–1886), American painter
 John Francis (publisher) (1811–1882), English businessman and campaigner against "taxes on knowledge"
 John Deffett Francis (1815–1901), Welsh portrait painter and art collector
 John M. Francis (1823–1897), American journalist and diplomat
 John Francis (bushranger) (c. 1825–?), Australian bushranger
 J. J. Francis (John Joseph Francis, 1839–1901), counsel in the British Colony of Hong Kong
 John Francis (New Zealand cricketer) (1846–1891), New Zealand cricketer
 John J. Francis (New Jersey judge) (1903–1984), American politician and State Supreme Court Justice
 Jack Francis (John Charles Francis, 1908–2001), Australian cricketer and Australian rules football player
 John G. F. Francis (born 1934), English computer scientist
 John Francis (environmentalist) (born 1946), American environmentalist
 John Francis (footballer) (born 1963), English association football player
 John Francis (boxer) (born 1965), Indian Olympic boxer
 John Francis (English cricketer) (born 1980), English cricketer

See also
Jon Francis (born 1964), former American football player
John Francis Regis (1597–1640), saint of the Roman Catholic Church